Micromanía is a Spanish computer game magazine. It was founded by the publisher HobbyPress, currently a subsidiary of Axel Springer SE. It was created in May 1985 and is one of the first magazines in Europe exclusively devoted to video games. It was first published soon after MicroHobby, which had been created just a few months earlier by the same publisher. The magazine in its two first periods was a major outlet supporting of the golden era of Spanish software. Micromanía celebrated its 25th anniversary in 2010. In July 2012, Axel Springer sold Micromanía to other owner, focussing its video game coverage in its other magazine, Hobby Consolas. Micromanía team continues the printed magazine independently, published by BlueOcean Publishing.

History
The first issue of Micromanía was published in 1985, with new issues released monthly. The publication of the magazine has been divided into three periods, called in Spanish "Épocas". The first period lasted for three years, with 35 issues. The second period, starting in 1988, changed its physical size to adopt what became its iconic large newspaper size. The second period had 80 issues, the last one published in January 1995, the 11th year since the magazine's inception. In February 1995 the third "Época" started, which as of 2015 continues to be published. The magazine reshaped itself to a normal-sized magazine. The magazine celebrated its 20 years anniversary in 2005, and its 30 years anniversary in 2014. 35th anniversary was celebrated in 2019.

See also
Hobby Consolas

References

External links
 Official website
 Profile of magazine and database of all issues at Devuego.es

1985 establishments in Spain
Axel Springer SE
Magazines established in 1985
Magazines published in Madrid
Monthly magazines published in Spain
Spanish-language magazines
Video game magazines published in Spain